is a station in Izumo, Shimane Prefecture, Japan.

Lines
West Japan Railway Company (JR West)
Sanin Main Line

History 

References 

Railway stations in Japan opened in 1982
Railway stations in Shimane Prefecture
Sanin Main Line